Kondossou is a town in east-central Ivory Coast. It is a sub-prefecture of M'Bahiakro Department in Iffou Region, Lacs District. The border of Vallée du Bandama District is 1.5 kilometres west of the town.

Kondossou was a commune until March 2012, when it became one of 1126 communes nationwide that were abolished.

In 2014, the population of the sub-prefecture of Kondossou was 11,320.

Villages
The 15 villages of the sub-prefecture of Kondossou and their population in 2014 are:

References

Sub-prefectures of Iffou
Former communes of Ivory Coast